Presidential elections were held in Liberia in 1877. The result was a victory for Anthony W. Gardiner of the True Whig Party. Gardiner took office on 7 January 1878. The election began the century-long political dominance of the True Whig Party.

References

Liberia
1877 in Liberia
Elections in Liberia
Election and referendum articles with incomplete results